This is a list of notable fictional and documentary films featuring the skinhead subculture.

 16 Years of Alcohol (2003) – Richard Jobson
 Adam's Apples (2005) – Anders Thomas Jensen
 Alpha Dog (2006) – Nick Cassavetes
 American History X (1998) – Tony Kaye
 Arena: Tell Us the Truth, Sham 69 (1979) – Jeff Perks and BBC TV
 Combat Girls (Kriegerin) (2011) – David Wnendt
 Diary of Skin (2005) – Jacobo Rispa
 Dog Years (1997) – Robert Loomis
 Farming (2018) - Adewale Akinnuoye-Agbaje
 Felon (2008) – Ric Roman Waugh
 French Blood (2015) - Diastéme
 Green Room (2015) – Jeremy Saulnier
 Hate in the Head (1994) – Uwe Frießner
 Higher Learning (1995) – John Singleton
 Imperium (2016)
 Kahlschlag (1993) – Hanno Brühl
 La guerra degli Antò (1999) –  Riccardo Milani
 Luna Park (1992) – Pavel Lungin
 Made In Britain (1982) – Alan Clarke
 Meantime (1983) – Mike Leigh
 My Dog Killer (2013) –  Mira Fornay
 Neo Ned (2005) – Van Fischer
 Oi! For England (1982) – Tony Smith
 Oi! Warning (2000) – Benjamin and Dominik Reding
 Pariah (1998) – Randolph Kret
 Romper Stomper (1992) – Geoffrey Wright
 Rough Cut and Ready Dubbed (1982) – Don Shaw
 Russia 88 (2009) – Pavel Bardin
 Skin (1995) - Vincent O'Connell
 Skin (2008) –  Hanro Smitsman
 Skin (2018) – Guy Nattiv
 Skin Gang (1999) – Bruce LaBruce
 Skinhead Attitude (2003) – Daniel Schweizer
 Skinheads (1989) – Greydon Clark
 Skinheads USA: Soldiers of the Race War (1993) – Shari Cookson
 Skinning (2010) – Stefan Filipović
 Speak Up! It's So Dark (1993) – Suzanne Osten
 Steel Toes (2006) – David Gow and Mark Adam
 Suburbia (film) (1983) – Penelope Spheeris
 Teste rasate (1993) – Claudio Fragasso
 The Believer (2001) – Mark Jacobson
 The Infiltrator (1995) – John MacKenzie
 The Story of Skinhead (2016) – Don Letts (BBC documentary)
 This Is England (2006) – Shane Meadows
 World of Skinhead (1996) – Doug Aubrey and Channel 4
 Young Soul Rebels (1991) - Isaac Julien

See also
List of punk films

References

Films
Skinhead